Events in the year 829 in Japan.

Incumbents
Monarch: Emperor Junna

Events
January 23 - Buddhist monk Kūkai establishes a private school known as the Shugei Shuchi Institute (traditional Japanese Date: 15th day of the 12th month, 828).
Ten monks conducted a ritual reading of the complete Buddhist canon at Miroku-ji in Usa in the 19th day of the 5th month

References 

829
9th century in Japan